Exoletuncus angulatus is a species of moth of the family Tortricidae. It is found in Ecuador (Napo Province) and Peru.

References

Moths described in 2005
Euliini
Moths of South America
Taxa named by Józef Razowski